On 6 October 2014, the bus (Na 3 Kha 5707) heading to Dhangadhi of Kailali district from Jorayal of Doti district, met with an accident killing at least 41 people and injuring many others, on a rural road at Chhatiwan VDC-5 in Doti district of remote western Nepal.

List of deaths
Shakuntala Malla, 20, of Saraswotinagar-1
Rajendra Shahi, 45
one-year-old Rohit Bohara
Bhagirati Ojha, 45
Karna Bahadur Shahi, 30
Harina Ojha, 65
Chakra Bahadur Bishwokarma, 30 and 
five-year-old Basanti Ojha of ward no. 2
Shanit Malla, 30
Dan Bahadur Saud, 54 of ward no. 3
Rewanta Deep Khadayat, 28
Padma Ojha, 29 of ward no. 5
Krishna Raj Bhandari, 50
Bhumi Raj Bhandari, 16 of ward no. 6
Nawaraj Bhatta, 32
Tekraj Bhatta, 30 and his wife Pashupati Bhatta, 28 of ward no. 8 and 
Hari Kathayat, 35 of ward no. 9

References

Doti bus accident
Doti bus accident
Bus incidents in Nepal
October 2014 events in Asia
2014 disasters in Nepal